Czarny is a surname of Polish language origin, related to Czerny. Historically, it was also a nickname meaning "black". It may refer to:

Leszek Czarny (c. 1241-1288), Polish prince
Zawisza Czarny (c. 1379-1428), Polish knight and nobleman

Polish-language surnames